For the last two seasons Ystalyfera RFC had finished in 12th place narrowly avoiding relegation. At the end of this campaign the ‘Fera would again finish 12th, but thanks to a league re-structure and the demise of being deducted 3 points resulted in relegation to Division 4 South West.

The end of 2005 started well. Up until January Ystalyfera had won six out of eleven matches. After the start of the new year however confidence ebbed away and the remaining fifteen saw only two wins, the last three being large defeats, 5-82 at Cwmavon where only 14 players were available and the bus broke down to add to the misery, 17-64 at Bryncoch and the last game of the season at home to Vardre 14-45. This last game was a replay of a 28 December fixture when although both sides were on the field and ready, no referee turned up and the game had to be postponed. Required contact with the nominated referee in the preceding week had been made but he later advised the WRU that he was ill and could not officiate. Although all league match referees are appointed by the WRU no automatic replacement was organised as the rules specify the home side must request for one. An appeal by the club on grounds that we were only aware of the referee’s illness on match day proved useless and three points were deducted. This was the ‘death knell’ Ystalyfera being 2 points short and relegated.

Unusually no specific cup fixtures took place this season. Voided in the Welsh Cup after ‘scratching’ the year before, the Swansea Valley Cup was cancelled, and the West Wales Cup was broken up into three Cup, Plate and Bowl competitions based on the first ten league match results. Competition entry was selected by league position level, Ystalyfera’s merit table position was 7th out of 19 in the West Wales Tovali Bowl. Only the top four qualified for the play off.

Damian James was Captain for a second year and was maximum points scorer with 148 and top try scorer with 13.  Ryan Evans was voted the most popular amongst the Players while Jonathan Evans was voted Supporters Player of the year.

National League Division 3 South West

Ystalyfera 2005/06 Season Results

Ystalyfera 2005/06 Season Player Stats

References

Sport in Neath Port Talbot